Michael Derry O'Donoghue (born 18 January 1996) is an Irish footballer who plays as a left-back.

O'Donoghue joined Colchester United's Academy in 2013, having previously progressed through the Reading Academy and the Leyton Orient Academy. He made his professional debut and his only appearance for Colchester in November 2014, before leaving in January 2017 to join Haringey Borough, until 2019 moving to Concord Rangers, only to return to Haringey Borough FC in 2020.

Career
Born in Islington, London, Irishman O'Donoghue joined League One club Colchester United's Academy in the summer of 2013, signing from Leyton Orient to begin his two-year scholarship with the club's academy. He had previously been signed to the Reading Academy.

During his first season with Colchester, O'Donoghue helped the under-18 side to win a league and cup double. He provided an assist for Macauley Bonne in the Youth Alliance Cup Final held against Bradford City at Valley Parade on 29 April 2014 in a 4–2 win for Colchester.

A ruptured achilles tendon injury which ruled Tosin Olufemi out for the entire 2014–15 season meant that O'Donoghue would be back-up only to Ben Gordon at left-back. Following further injuries to Magnus Okuonghae and Frankie Kent, O'Donoghue was named in the starting line-up for Colchester's League One match with Barnsley on 14 November 2014. He made his debut and played the full 90 minutes in the 3–2 defeat at Oakwell. He then set his sights on keeping his place in the team, but found himself pushed out of the starting eleven by Queens Park Rangers loanee Cole Kpekawa.

O'Donoghue was ruled out for the remainder of the season in December 2014 after rupturing cruciate ligaments during a training session. Despite his injury and with his contract expiring in the summer, O'Donoghue signed a one-year extension with Colchester on 8 May 2015.

After a season of recovery from knee surgery during 2015–16, O'Donoghue impressed enough in the development squad to earn himself a new contract, and signed a one-year extension in May 2016.

On 20 January 2017, O'Donoghue was released by Colchester United by mutual consent. He joined Isthmian League Division One North side Haringey Borough, and went straight into their starting eleven for Borough's 6–0 win over Soham Town Rangers on 21 January.

Career statistics

Honours
Colchester United U18
2013–14 Football League Youth Alliance South East winner
2013–14 Football League Youth Alliance Cup winner

References

External links

1996 births
Living people
Footballers from Islington (district)
Republic of Ireland association footballers
Association football fullbacks
Reading F.C. players
Leyton Orient F.C. players
Colchester United F.C. players
Haringey Borough F.C. players
English Football League players
Isthmian League players